Serbian–Turkish relations are foreign relations between Serbia and Turkey. Serbia has an embassy in Ankara and a consulate-general in Istanbul. Turkey has an embassy in Belgrade. Both countries are full members of the Council of Europe, the Organization for Security and Co-operation in Europe (OSCE), the Central European Free Trade Agreement (CEFTA) and the Organization of the Black Sea Economic Cooperation (BSEC).

History 

Relations between the two countries date back to the Late Middle Ages. After a series of wars that included the 1371 Battle of Maritsa and the Battle of Kosovo in 1389, the Serbian Despotate became part of the Ottoman Empire in 1459. 

Ottoman Serbia remained under direct Turkish rule for three-and-a-half centuries. Many illustrious figures in Ottoman history were of Serbian descent, including Queen Mara Branković, the Grand Viziers Sokollu Mehmed Pasha and Mahmud Pasha Angelović, and the general Omar Pasha.

In 1815, the Serbian Revolution established the autonomous Principality of Serbia, which won independence from the Ottoman Empire de facto in 1867 and de jure in 1878. Diplomatic relations with the Ottoman Empire were established in 1886. Serbia opened consulates in Üsküp (Skopje), Selânik (Salonica), Manastır (Bitola), and Priştine (Pristina) over the next few years. Following the 1894 Istanbul earthquake numerous civil society organisations organized benefit events for the collection of aid for the victims of the catastrophy.

The 1910s was a tumultuous decade in Serbian-Turkish relations. The two countries broke off diplomatic relations with the outbreak of the Balkan Wars in 1912, during which Serbia captured large tracts of Ottoman territory including Kosovo and parts of modern-day North Macedonia. Serbia again declared war on the Ottoman Empire on 2 November 1914 during World War I, although this time the two countries never came into direct conflict with each other.

Diplomatic relations resumed in 1925 between the Kingdom of Yugoslavia and the Republic of Turkey, both being successor states of Serbia and the Ottoman Empire in the aftermath of World War I.

During the Communist Yugoslav period, Serbia (as part of Yugoslavia) and Turkey continued to maintain relations, which for the large part were friendly (see Turkey-Yugoslavia relations).

In 1982 two assassins of the Armenian Secret Army for the Liberation of Armenia shot the ambassador of Turkey in Yugoslavia Galip Balkar as revenge for the Armenian genocide. Unarmed citizens of Belgrade who were near the event tried to stop the culprits and chased after them, which resulted in two Serbian civilians wounded and one dead. Ambassador Balkar died two days later in the hospital. The event is commemorated every year by Turkey and Serbia.

With the outbreak of the Yugoslav Wars, Turkey expressed its solidarity with the Muslim-majority regions of Bosnia-Herzegovina and Kosovo, causing some friction with Serbia.

Modern relations 

Turkish Defense Minister Vecdi Gönül and Serbian Defense Minister Dragan Šutanovac met in Ankara on 12 May 2009 to sign a defence cooperation agreement. Gönül stated that, “Although we do not have a common border, we see Serbia as a neighbour,” and, “Turkey desires to maintain and improve its relations with Serbia the most, among all the other Balkan states.” Šutanovac confirmed that, “There are a lot of things to do in this field,” and, “We are thinking of taking some initiatives in the defense industry together, like co-production in Turkey or Serbia.”

Turkish President Abdullah Gül paid a visit to Serbia on 26 October 2009, and became the first Turkish President to visit Serbia since 1986.

Erdoğan's Kosovo speech
In October 2013, Serbia's foreign ministry condemned a statement by Turkish Prime Minister Recep Tayyip Erdoğan that he made during a visit to Kosovo. Erdoğan said in his speech: "Do not forget that Kosovo is Turkey and Turkey is Kosovo". He also added that he "feels at home" whenever he visits Kosovo. The Serbian foreign ministry responded by saying that Erdoğan's remarks "cannot be received as friendly," and that the town of Prizren, where the speech was made, "is probably the least appropriate place for such statements" due to it being the initial burial place of Serbia's medieval emperor Dušan the Mighty.

Various Serbian politicians, including Prime Minister Ivica Dačić and parliament speaker Nebojsa Stefanovic, rejected the Turkish PM's speech. Furthermore, the Turkish ambassador in Belgrade was summoned by the Serbian foreign ministry to demand explanations on October 26, and President Tomislav Nikolic announced Serbia's withdrawal from trilateral talks which included Turkey and Bosnia that same day, demanding Turkey's apology for the "scandal". The statements were also condemned by Heinz-Christian Strache, leader of the Freedom Party of Austria, who believed that Europe should rise against the Turkish PM. "His territorial pretensions in Europe are a step away from the restoration of the Ottoman Empire that Erdoğan wants," Strache said in his statement.

However, Turkish Foreign Minister Ahmet Davutoğlu said during an interview on the TRT channel that Erdoğan's words have been misunderstood. "Remarks which have been cut out from the whole speech were taken to grounds we don’t want. We also aim to have good relations with Serbia. Turkey maintains an equal distance to all Balkan countries," Davutoğlu stressed.

Post 2013 relations
Relations between two countries recovered quickly after 2013 speech with significant increase in number of flights travelers between Belgrade Nikola Tesla Airport and Istanbul airports and entrance of Turkish companies such as Halkbank at Serbian market. In March 2016 in interview for the N 1 television,  CNN International's regional broadcast partner and affiliate, Turkish ambassador in Belgrade Mehmet Kemal Bozaj stated that diplomacy of two countries have excellent cooperation regardless of different positions over the question of 2008 Kosovo declaration of independence while also stating that Turkey support Belgrade–Pristina negotiations. On the margins of 2016 Conference on Global Sustainable Transport in Ashgabat, Turkmenistan Minister of Mining and Energy of Serbia, Aleksandar Antić stated that good relations between Serbia and Turkey contribute to the stability of the entire region. Minister also stated that reconstruction of A4 motorway will have direct positive effect on Turkey since the highway is used by Turkish citizens (especially truck drivers) who are traveling between their country and Central and Western Europe. During his meeting with his Turkish counterpart Mevlüt Çavuşoğlu in Ankara in October 2016, Serbian Foreign Minister Ivica Dačić stated that bilateral relations are crucial for the region and that Serbia proved to be Turkish friend during 2016 Turkish coup d'état attempt when Belgrade explicitly at that same first night express opposition to any attempt of violent takeover and express support for the democratically elected government of Turkey. He also invited Turkish President and Mevlüt Çavuşoğlu to visit Belgrade. In December 2016 National Assembly of Serbia Deputy Speaker Vladimir Marinković attended the opening of the renovated building of the Embassy of Turkey in Belgrade and on that occasion he stated that political relations between the two countries are very good. He expressed full support of all state institutions of Serbia to Turkey in the process of overcoming post 2016 Turkish coup d'état attempt situation, and that Serbia want to see stable Turkey which is of great importance for the whole region.

In 2022, neither Serbia nor Turkey backed the European Union's and United States' sanctions on Russia for the invasion of Ukraine.

Agreements
In June 2009, the two countries signed a free trade agreement.

See also 
 Foreign relations of Serbia
 Foreign relations of Turkey
 Kosovo–Turkey relations
 Turkish Serbs
 Turks in Serbia
 Islam in Serbia
 Serbs in Turkey
 Gallipoli Serbs
 Turkey–Yugoslavia relations

References

External links 

 
Turkey
Bilateral relations of Turkey
Relations of colonizer and former colony